Lalo Hartich (29 December 1904, in Buenos Aires – 31 March 1979, in Buenos Aires) was an Argentine actor. He starred in the 1950 film Arroz con leche under director Carlos Schlieper.

Selected filmography
 The Phantom of the Operetta (1955)

References

External links
 
 

1904 births
1979 deaths
Male actors from Buenos Aires
Argentine male film actors